223 (two hundred [and] twenty-three) is the natural number following 222 and preceding 224.

In mathematics 
223 is a prime number. Among the 720 permutations of the numbers from 1 to 6, exactly 223 of them have the property that at least one of the numbers is fixed in place by the permutation and the numbers less than it and greater than it are separately permuted among themselves.

In connection with Waring's problem, 223 requires the maximum number of terms (37 terms) when expressed as a sum of positive fifth powers, and is the only number that requires that many terms.

In other fields
 .223 (disambiguation), the caliber of several firearm cartridges
 The years 223 and 223 BC
 The number of synodic months of a Saros

References

Integers